Fernando Sancho Les (7 January 1916 – 31 July 1990) was a Spanish actor.

Biography
He was born in Zaragoza, in Aragon, Spain on 7 January 1916 and died at Hospital Militar Gómez Ulla in Madrid on 31 July 1990 from a liver failure during or following surgery to remove a malignant tumor in the pancreas. He was interred in Madrid.

Fernando Sancho fought in the Spanish Civil War on the rebel side, being wounded several times and achieving the rank of lieutenant in the Legion.

Career
He was often typecast as a Mexican bandit in Spaghetti Westerns, including The Big Gundown (directed by Sergio Sollima), A Pistol for Ringo and Return of Ringo (directed by Duccio Tessari), Arizona Colt (directed by Michele Lupo), Minnesota Clay (directed by Sergio Corbucci), and Sartana (directed by Gianfranco Parolini). 
He also appeared in a number of Spanish horror movies in the 1960s and 1970s. One of his better known horror parts was the role of a corrupt small-town mayor in Return of the Blind Dead (El ataque de los muertos sin ojos), directed by Amando de Ossorio.

Another notable horror film was Orloff and the Invisible Man (1971), directed by Pierre Chevalier and starring Howard Vernon, an unofficial continuation of the Dr. Orloff saga begun by Jess Franco in The Awful Dr. Orloff (1962).  

He turned up briefly in the epic film Lawrence of Arabia playing the Turkish sergeant who arrests T. E. Lawrence in Deraa. He appeared in five Greek war movies (1970-73); three of these involved World War II (i.e., Battle of Crete, Greek Resistance, Fort Roupel) and the other two involved the Greek War of Independence and the resistance of Souliotes against Ali Pasha.

Sancho had a prolific career and remained active in films up to his death.

Awards
He won the Medallas del Círculo de Escritores Cinematográficos for La guerrilla in 1972, and in 1980 for all his career.

Selected filmography

 ¡Polizón a bordo! (1941) - Camarero
 Orosia (1944) - Mañico bronquista
 Una mujer en un taxi (1944)
 Ni pobre, ni rico, sino todo lo contrario (1944)
 Estaba escrito (1945)
 Leyenda de feria (1946)
 Eres un caso (1946)
 Las inquietudes de Shanti Andía (1947) - Tristán de Ugarte
 Héroes del 95 (1947) - General Tampico
 Abel Sánchez (1947)
 Mariona Rebull (1947) - Señor Roig
 When the Angels Sleep (1947) - Peral
 El ángel gris (1947)
 The Black Siren (1947) - Mayordomo
 Alma baturra (1948)
 Mi enemigo el doctor (1948)
 Embrujo (1948) - Mister Benson
 El tambor del Bruch (1948)
 La muralla feliz (1948) - Mariano García
 Canción mortal (1948)
 La mies es mucha (1948) - Clarenberg
 Campo Bravo (1948)
 Don Juan de Serrallonga (1949) - Tallaferro
 Aquellas palabras (1949)
 Vida en sombras (1949) - Productor
 Cita con mi viejo corazón (1950)
 That Luzmela Girl (1950)
 Si te hubieses casado conmigo (1950) - Taxista
 Agustina of Aragon (1950)
 La mujer de nadie (1950) - Martorell
 The Dream of Andalusia (1951)
 Service at Sea (1951) - Don Tofol
 Our Lady of Fatima (1951) - Comunista 1
 The Great Galeoto (1951) - Vizconde de Nebreda
 Dawn of America (1951) - Pedro Salcedo
 From Madrid to Heaven (1952) - Empresario de 'El Paraíso'
 The Eyes Leave a Trace (1952) - Comensal irascible
 The Song of Sister Maria (1952) - Rafael
 Sor Intrépida (1952) - Mr. Evans
 Last Day (1952) - Profesor Lorenzo
 María Dolores (1953) - Antonio
 La alegre caravana (1953)
 Airport (1953) - Mr. Fogg
 I Was a Parish Priest (1953) - Barrona
 Plot on the Stage (1953) - Policía 1º
 The Beauty of Cadiz (1953) - Pere gitane
 Nadie lo sabrá (1953) - Ángel
 Judas' Kiss (1954) - Padre del condenado
 The Adventurer of Seville (1954) - Sir Albert
 Castles in Spain (1954) - Posadero
 He Died Fifteen Years Ago (1954) - Joaquín Campos
 Tres hombres van a morir (1954) - Peauleguin
 The Other Life of Captain Contreras (1955) - Antonio Cornejo
 That Lady (1955) - Diego
 Death of a Cyclist (1955) - Guardia de tráfico
 Suspenso en comunismo (1956) - Pedro
 Cuerda de presos (1956) - Juan Díaz de Garayo, 'El Sacamantecas'
 Torrepartida (1956) - El Alicantino
 Pasión en el mar (1956) - Vicente
 Horas de pánico (1957)
 Der Stern von Afrika (1957) - Strauch
 Susanna Whipped Cream (1957) - Giovanni
 Femmine tre volte (1957) - Guardia notturna
 ...Y eligió el infierno (1957)
 El inquilino (1958) - Jiménez
 Io, mammeta e tu (1958) - Turco
 Let's Make the Impossible! (1958) - John
 Gli zitelloni (1958)
 Die Sklavenkarawane (1958) - Prof. Ignaz Pfotenhauer
 Patio andaluz (1958)
 La ragazza di piazza San Pietro (1958) - The Boxing Coach
 Entierro de un funcionario en primavera (1958) - Jefe de bomberos
 Luxury Cabin (1959) - Ernesto
 Llegaron dos hombres (1959) - Gregorio
 Der Löwe von Babylon (1959) - Prof. Ignaz Pfotenhauer
 A sangre fría (1959) - Enrique
 El secreto de papá (1959)
 Toro bravo (1960)
 The Little Colonel (1960) - Vinagre
 El indulto (1960) - El Maroma
 La paz empieza nunca (1960) - Mirín
 Taxi for Tobruk (1961) - German Corporal in the Oasis
 Goliath Against the Giants (1961) - Namathos
 Alerta en el cielo (1961) - Sargento Montebelo
 El pobre García (1961) - Elías
 King of Kings (1961) - the demon-possessed man
 Madame (1961) - Pommier
 My Son, the Hero (1962)
 Zorro the Avenger (1962) - Sargento
 The Son of Captain Blood (1962) - Timothy Thomas
 Der Teppich des Grauens (1962) - Gunman
 I tromboni di Fra Diavolo (1962) - Mammone
 Lawrence of Arabia (1962) - Turkish Sergeant (uncredited)
 Magic Fountain (1963) - Priest
 55 Days at Peking (1963) - Belgian Minister
 The Sign of the Coyote (1963) - Lugones Brother
 Tres hombres buenos (1963) - Diego Abriles
 No temas a la ley (1963) - Eugenio - Le patron de l'hôtel
 The Secret of the Black Widow (1963) - Slim
 The Ceremony (1963) - Shaoush
 José María (1963)
 El precio de un asesino (1963) - Rufo
 Three Ruthless Ones (1964) - Pedro Ramirez
 Two Gangsters in the Wild West (1964) - Rio
 Backfire (1964) - Ilmaz
 Black Angel of the Mississippi (1964) - Garcia
 Crimen (1964) - El Juez
 The Seven from Texas (1964) - Scometti, the half-breed
 Minnesota Clay (1964) - Gen. Domingo Ortiz
 Desafío en Río Bravo (1964) - Pancho Bogan
 La nueva Cenicienta (1964) - Fernando
 I due toreri (1964) - Don Alonso
 Toto of Arabia (1965) - Ali el Buzur
 Historias de la televisión (1965) - Presentador TV
 A Pistol for Ringo (1965) - Sancho
 Los cuatreros (1965) - Pancho
 Two Sergeants of General Custer (1965) - Colonel Dolukin
 Pistoleros de Arizona (1965) - Carrancho
 Agent 3S3: Passport to Hell (1965) - Serg. Fidhouse
 Agent 077: From the Orient with Fury (1965) - Loud Patron in Paris Restaurant
 Wild Kurdistan (1965) - Padischah
 Man from Canyon City (1965) - Carrancho
 100.000 dollari per Ringo (1965) - Chuck
 Doc, Hands of Steel (1965) - Pablo Reyes
 The Return of Ringo (1965) - Esteban Fuentes
 Kingdom of the Silver Lion (1965) - Padischah
 Seven Guns for the MacGregors (1966) - Miguel
 Seven Dollars on the Red (1966) - El Cachal / Sancho
 Seven Magnificent Guns (1966) - Sancho Rodrigo Rodriguez
 The Almost Perfect Crime (1966) - Omar
 Agent 3S3: Massacre in the Sun (1966) - General Emilio Siqueiros
 Per il gusto di uccidere (1966) - Sanchez
 Dynamite Jim (1966) - Pablo Reyes
 Arizona Colt (1966) - Torrez Gordo Watch
 Il vostro super agente Flit (1966) - Smirnoff
 Django Shoots First (1966) - Gordon
 The Big Gundown (1966) - Captain Segura
 Il grande colpo di Surcouf (1966) - Le geôlier
 The Tough One (1966)
 Clint the Stranger (1967) - Ross
 Ten Thousand Dollars for a Massacre (1967) - Stardust Vasquez
 Wanted Johnny Texas (1967) - Colonel Steward - Texas Rangers
 Come rubare un quintale di diamanti in Russia (1967) - Prof. Higgins
 Odio per odio (1967) - Coyote
 El rostro del asesino (1967) - Suarez
 Dakota Joe (1967) - Don Carlos
 Killer Kid (1967) - Vilar
 If One Is Born a Swine (1967) - El Bicho
 Massacre Mania (1967) - Professor Kenitz
 Crónica de un atraco (1968) - Fernando Gonzales
 Go for Broke (1968) - Carranza
 Sangue chiama sangue (1968) - 'El Sancho' Rodríguez
 Per 100.000 dollari ti ammazzo (1968) - Concalves
 Rita of the West (1968) - Pancho
 If You Meet Sartana Pray for Your Death (1968) - Jose Manuel Mendoza
 Requiem for a Gringo (1968) - Porfirio Carranza
 Wrath of God (1968) - Burd
 The Magnificent Tony Carrera (1968) - Einstein
 Ciccio Forgives, I Don't (1968) - El Dablo / El Pantera
 Tarzan in the Golden Grotto (1969)
 Twenty Thousand Dollars for Seven (1969) - Bill Cochran, capo dei banditi
 Amor a todo gas (1969) - Wagner
 Simón Bolívar (1969) - Fernando González
 Franco, Ciccio e il pirata Barbanera (1969) - Il Pirata Barbanera
 La banda de los tres crisantemos (1970) - Burton
 Golpe de mano (Explosión) (1970) - El Pernas
 In the Folds of the Flesh (1970) - Pascal Gorriot
 The Boldest Job in the West (1970) - Ramón Sartana
 Orloff Against the Invisible Man (1970) - Le garde-chasse
 In the Battle of Crete (1970) - Manousos Kallergis
 28 October 1940 (1971) - Tryfonas Platanias
 Dig Your Grave Friend... Sabata's Coming (1971) - León Pompero
 Los buitres cavarán tu fosa (1971) - Pancho Corrales
  (1971) - Bill - Steward / Paco
 The Great Moment of the Greek War of Independence: Papaflessas (1971) - Mahmud Dramali Pasha
 The Boldest Job in the West (1972) - Reyes
 Timanfaya (Amor prohibido) (1972)
 Watch Out Gringo! Sabata Will Return (1972) - Carrancho
 You Are a Traitor and I'll Kill You! (1972) - Sebastian
 La caza del oro (1972) - Fermín Rojas
 Tutti fratelli nel West… per parte di padre (1972)
 Fabulous Trinity (1972) - Coronel Jiménez
 Souliotes (1972) - Ali Pasas
 Las juergas de 'El Señorito''' (1973) - Toni López
 The Guerrilla (1973) - Juan
 The Last of Rupel (1973)
 Three Supermen of the West (1973) - FBI Director
 Return of the Blind Dead (1973) - Mayor Duncan
 Storia di karatè, pugni e fagioli (1973) - Espartero
 Man with the Golden Winchester (1973) - Colonel Michel Leblanche
 El pantano de los cuervos (1974) - Inspector
 The King is the Best Mayor (1974) - Conde
 Il mio nome è Scopone e faccio sempre cappotto (1974) - Aguadulce
 Voodoo Black Exorcist (1974) - Comisario Domínguez
 Los caballeros del Botón de Ancla (1974) - Andrés Dopico
 Death's Newlyweds (1975) - Comandante Lauria
 The Possessed (1975) - Police Chief
 La cruz del diablo (1975) - Ignacio
 What Changed Charley Farthing? (1975) - Lupez
 La última jugada (1975) - Swartas Pinto
 Los casados y la menor (1975) - Comisario
 The Legion Like Women (1976) - André Meroy
 El alijo (1976) - Paco
 Memoria (1976) - Profesor Ulop
 Halt die Luft an alter Gauner - Der Stockfisch und das Stinktier (1976) - Admiral Pedro Santos
 Las alimañas (1977) - Louis
 La mujer es un buen negocio (1977) - Don Anselmo
 Change of Sex (1977) - José Bou, padre de José María
 Quel pomeriggio maledetto (1977) - The Arms Dealer
 Doña Perfecta (1977)
 Estimado Sr. juez... (1978) - Tambarria
 Trampa sexual (1978) - Padre de Marta
 Venus de fuego (1978) - Subcomisario
 Zwei tolle Käfer räumen auf (1979) - Alfonso, Mafia-Boss
 Father Cami's Wedding (1979) - Blas
 Las siete magníficas y audaces mujeres (1979)
 And in the Third Year, He Rose Again (1980) - Coronel
 Spoiled Children (1980) - Agustín
 El lobo negro (1981)
 Asalto al casino (1981)
 Revenge of the Black Wolf (1981) - Corporal Donovan
 Black Commando (1982) - President Bethancourt
 Fredy el croupier (1982) - Cura
 De camisa vieja a chaqueta nueva (1982) - Cónsul alemán
 Mar brava (1983) - Alcalde
 1919, crónica del alba (1983) - Don Hermógenes
 The Autonomines (1983) - Bernardo
 Invierno en Marbella (1983) - Cardenal
 Al este del oeste (1984) - Chapulín
 The Cheerful Colsada Girls (1984) - Sr. Barbero
 The Heifer (1985) - Alcalde
 Los presuntos (1986) - Mafioso italiano
 Policía (1987) - Comandante Castillejo
 La luna negra'' (1989) - Mariano

References

External links

1916 births
1990 deaths
People from Zaragoza
Spanish male film actors
Male Spaghetti Western actors
20th-century Spanish male actors
Deaths from cancer in Spain
Deaths from pancreatic cancer